Junius is an unincorporated community in Lake County, in the U.S. state of South Dakota.

History
Junius was originally called Midway, and under the latter name was laid out in 1878. The present name honors Junius, the son of a railroad official. A post office called Junius was established in 1904, and remained in operation until 1957.

References

Unincorporated communities in Lake County, South Dakota
Unincorporated communities in South Dakota